The 2019–20 Towson Tigers men's basketball team represent Towson University during the 2019–20 NCAA Division I men's basketball season. The Tigers, led by ninth-year head coach Pat Skerry, play their home games at the SECU Arena in Towson, Maryland as members of the Colonial Athletic Association.

Previous season
The Tigers finished the 2018–19 season 10–22, 6–12 in CAA play to finish in a tie for eighth place. They lost in the first round of the CAA tournament to James Madison.

Offseason

Departures

Incoming transfers

2019 recruiting class

2020 recruiting class

Roster

Schedule and results

|-
!colspan=9 style=| Regular season
|-

|-
!colspan=9 style=| CAA tournament
|-

Source

References

Towson Tigers men's basketball seasons
Towson
Towson
Towson